Medicine Bow may refer to:

 Medicine Bow, Wyoming, a town in southeastern Wyoming
 Medicine Bow Mountains, a mountain range in Colorado and Wyoming
 Medicine Bow Peak, the highest peak of the Medicine Bow Mountains
 Medicine Bow National Forest, a U.S. National forest in Wyoming
 Camp Medicine Bow, Yawgoog Scout Reservation, Rhode Island
 Medicine Bow, an alias of American musician Kali Malone